Aladdin is a folk tale of Middle Eastern origin.

Aladdin, Aladin, and variants such as Aladdin and His Magic Lamp, may also refer to:

Arts and entertainment

Disney franchise
 Aladdin (franchise)
 Aladdin (Disney character), protagonist of Disney's Aladdin franchise
 Aladdin (1992 Disney film), an animated film
 Aladdin (1992 soundtrack)
 Aladdin (2011 musical), based on the film
 Aladdin (animated TV series), 1994–1995
 Disney's Aladdin: A Musical Spectacular, a Broadway-style show, 2003–2016
 Disney's Aladdin (Capcom video game), 1993
 Disney's Aladdin (Virgin Games video game), 1993
 Disney's Aladdin (1994 video game), for Sega's 8-bit consoles 
 Aladdin (2019 film), a live action adaptation of the 1992 film
 Aladdin (2019 soundtrack)

Films
 Aladdin and the Wonderful Lamp (1917 film), a silent film
 "Aladdin and His Wonderful Lamp", a 1939 short film with Popeye as Aladdin
 "Aladdin and the Wonderful Lamp" (1934 film), an animated short film directed by Ub Iwerks
 Aladdin and His Lamp, a 1952 film 
 Alladin and the Wonderful Lamp (1957 film), an Indian film
 Aladdin (1958 film), a television musical by Cole Porter
 The Wonders of Aladdin, a 1961 film
 Aladdin and His Magic Lamp (1967 film), a Soviet film
 Aladdin and His Magic Lamp, a 1966 British TV movie starring Arthur Askey
 Aladdin and His Magic Lamp (1970 film), a French animated film
 Allauddinum Albhutha Vilakkum ('Aladdin and the Magic Lamp'), a 1979 Malayalam film 
 Aladdin and the Wonderful Lamp (1982 film), a Japanese anime film
 Aladdin, or Superfantagenio, a 1986 Italian film
 Aladdin (1990 film), an American musical television film 
 Aladdin (1992 Golden Films film)
 Aladin (film), a 2009 Indian Hindi-language fantasy action film

Musicals, operas and plays
 Aladdin (play), by Adam Oehlenschläger, 1805
 Aladdin (opera), by Kurt Atterberg, 1941
 Aladdin (1979 musical), by Sandy Wilson

Music
 Aladdin (Nielsen), a 1919 score by Carl Nielsen to accompany a new production of the play
 Aladdin and His Wonderful Lamp (Cliff Richard and the Shadows album), 1964

Television
 Aladdin – Naam Toh Suna Hoga, an Indian TV series 2018–2021
 "Aladdin and His Wonderful Lamp", a 1986 episode of Faerie Tale Theatre

Businesses and brands
 Aladdin (BlackRock) An all-encompassing data collection and evaluation management system for risk assessments of investments (Asset, Liability, and Debt and Derivative Investment Network)
 Aladdin (food & beverage containers)
 The Aladdin Company, a company that sold mail-order houses
 Aladdin Industries, makers of vacuum flasks and lunchboxes
 Aladdin Knowledge Systems, a software company 
 Aladdin Paperbacks, a division of Simon & Schuster, USA
 Aladdin Records, a record label
 Aladdin Systems, later Allume Systems, a software company

People
 Aladdin (name), a male given name
 Aladdin (performer) (Aladdin Abdullah Achmed Anthony Pallante, 1912–1970)

Places

Settlements
 Aladin, Azerbaijan
 Aladin, Iran
 Aladdin, Wyoming, U.S.
 Aladdin City, Florida, U.S.
 Aladdin (crater), on Saturn's moon Enceladus

Places of entertainment
 Aladdin (hotel and casino), in Las Vegas, U.S., 1962–1997
 Planet Hollywood Las Vegas, on the same site, known as The Aladdin 2000–2007
 Aladdin Theater, a historic theater in Cocoa, Florida, U.S.
 Aladdin Theater (Portland, Oregon), U.S.
 Aladdin Theatre for the Performing Arts, now Zappos Theatre, Los Angeles, U.S.
 Aladin Music Hall, a nightclub in Bremen, Germany

Science and technology
 Aladdin Deck Enhancer, a games console adapter
 ALADDiN, a line of chipsets by ALi Corporation
 Aladin Sky Atlas, interactive software 
 EMT Aladin, a German miniature unmanned aerial vehicle
 Aladin (protein), also known as adracalin, is a nuclear envelope protein

Other uses
 Aladdinn (1975–2010), a leading sire of Arabian horses
 Project Aladdin, a UNESCO intercultural project to counter Holocaust denial

See also

 Ala ol Din (disambiguation), sometimes written Alaeddin or Alaed Din
 Aladdin Sane, 1973 album and song by David Bowie
 Arabic name#Common mistakes: misspelling Alāʾ al-dīn as Allāh al-dīn